Harry Edgar Trout (April 4, 1876 – January 11, 1941) was an American football coach.  He serve as the ninth head football coach
at West Virginia University in Morgantown, West Virginia and he held that position for the 1903 season.  His coaching record at West Virginia was 7–1.

Trout was the first coach at West Virginia to record a victory over rival Washington and Jefferson College with a 6–0 win on November 26, 1903. The game marked not only the first victory over Washington and Jefferson, but the first time after nine attempts West Virginia had managed to score against the "Presidents".

Trout graduated from Lafayette College in 1903 and married Jane McBride of Portland, Oregon in January 1913 at Chicago. Trout later worked for a steel company in Pennsylvania. From 1936 to 1938 he served on the Lafayette College board of trustees. He died January 11, 1941 in Johnstown and was buried in Granview Cemetery in that city.

Head coaching record

References

External links
 

1876 births
1941 deaths
Lafayette College alumni
Lafayette College trustees
West Virginia Mountaineers football coaches
People from Dauphin County, Pennsylvania